Nébald is a surname. Notable people with the surname include:
 György Nébald (born 1956), Hungarian fencer, who won three Olympic medals in the team sabre competition
 Ildikó Mincza-Nébald (born 1969), Hungarian épée fencer
 Rudolf Nébald (born 1952), Hungarian fencer who won a bronze medal in the team sabre competition at the 1980 Summer Olympics

Hungarian-language surnames
German-language surnames